Laurie John Ferguson  (4 September 1924 – 17 September 2002) was an Australian politician and member of the New South Wales Legislative Assembly for the Australian Labor Party (New South Wales Branch). He served in  Neville Wran's state government as the Deputy Premier of New South Wales from 1976 to 1984.

Early life
Born in the inner Sydney suburb of Zetland, Ferguson was educated at Granville Convent and Marist Brothers College, Parramatta, both Catholic schools.

After leaving school he was variously a farmhand, textile worker, builder's labourer and bricklayer and was an organiser for the Building Workers' Industrial Union.  From 1942 to 1946 he served in the Second Australian Imperial Force.

Following his demobilisation, he became active in municipal, and then state, politics. He was an alderman on Parramatta Council from 1954 to 1959, and Deputy Mayor in 1959. He married Mary Ellen Bett; the couple had three sons (Laurie, Martin and Andrew) and two daughters.

Political career
Ferguson was the member for Merrylands from March 1959 to 1962 and 1968 to 5 March 1984.  From 1962 to 1968, he was member for Fairfield. A member of the Labor Party's left wing, he was best known as Deputy Premier and Minister for Public Works and Minister for Ports, from May 1976 until February 1984, in the cabinet headed by Neville Wran. He was also Minister for Housing from May 1976 to February 1977.

Death

Honours
Ferguson was made an Officer of the Order of Australia for his service to government and to the NSW parliament in the Australia Day honours in 1985.

References

1924 births
2002 deaths
Australian Army soldiers
Australian Labor Party members of the Parliament of New South Wales
Australian Army personnel of World War II
Deputy Premiers of New South Wales
Deaths from cancer in New South Wales
Labor Left politicians
Members of the New South Wales Legislative Assembly
Officers of the Order of Australia
Politicians from Sydney
20th-century Australian politicians
Deaths from mesothelioma